The stilt-owls (Grallistrix) is an extinct genus of true owls which contains four species, all of which lived on the Hawaiian Islands. 

Grallistrix can be loosely translated as "owl on stilts". The genus received this name due to the long legs and terrestrial habits which they evolved in the absence of mammalian predators on their island homes. They fed on smaller birds such as Hawaiian honeycreepers. They were also able to fly.

The owls were never seen alive by scientists and are known only from subfossil bones.

Species 

Kaua‘i stilt-owl, Grallistrix auceps
Maui stilt-owl, Grallistrix erdmani
Moloka‘i stilt-owl, Grallistrix geleches
O‘ahu stilt-owl, Grallistrix orion

See also
Tyto pollens
Ornimegalonyx
Late Quaternary prehistoric birds
List of extinct birds
List of fossil birds
List of extinct animals
Flightless birds

References

External links
 http://www.extinct.minks-lang.de/7voegel/a.birdsfamilien/strigidae1.htm

Extinct birds of Hawaii
Holocene extinctions
Late Quaternary prehistoric birds